Half Man may refer to:

 Half Man (band), a Swedish blues rock band
 Half-Man, a French fairy tale

See also
 :Category:Human hybrids
 
 Halber Mensch (English: Half Man), a 1985 album by Einstürzende Neubauten
 "Half a Man", a song by Willie Nelson
 Half a Man (film), a 1925 silent film
 "Half a Man", a song by Dean Lewis from A Place We Knew
 Half the Man (disambiguation)
 Halfmens or Pachypodium namaquanum, a succulent plant